Faxonia is a genus of flowering plants in the family Asteraceae.

There is only one known species, Faxonia pusilla, endemic to the Mexican State of Baja California Sur.

The genus is named for botanical illustrator Charles Edward Faxon of Arnold Arboretum.

References

Millerieae
Monotypic Asteraceae genera
Flora of Baja California Sur
Endemic flora of Mexico
Taxa named by Townshend Stith Brandegee